This is a list of the Australian Phasmatodea. There are approximately 150 species.

The list is organized from family, to subfamily, genus and then species.

Phasmatidae 
subfamily: Platycraninae
genus: Anophelepis
Anophelepis telesphorus
genus: Graeffea
Graeffea coccophaga
genus: Megacrania
Megacrania batesii
Megacrania alpheus
genus: Echetlus
Echetlus peristhenes

subfamily: Palophinae

genus: Palophus
(3 undescribed species)

subfamily: Eurycanthinae
genus: Eurycantha
Eurycantha sifia
genus: Dryococelus
Dryococelus australis

subfamily: Lonchodinae
genus: Lonchodes
Lonchodes caurus
Lonchodes longiceps
genus: Carausius
Carausius insularis
Carausius macerrimus
genus: Hyrtacus
Hyrtacus coenosa
Hyrtacus eutrachelia
Hyrtacus peridromes
Hyrtacus tuberculatus
Hyrtacus imitans
Hyrtacus carinata
Hyrtacus striatus
(16 undescribed species)
genus: Marcenia
Marcenia frenchi
Marcenia gracilis
genus: Austrocarausius
Austrocarausius mercurius
Austrocarausius nigropunctatus

subfamily: Pachymorphinae
genus: Acanthoderus
Acanthoderus spinosus
genus: Pachymorpha
Pachymorpha squalida
Pachymorpha simplicipes
Pachymorpha pasithoe
(14 undescribed species)

subfamily: Phasmatinae
genus: Ctenomorpha
Ctenomorpha chronus
Ctenomorpha acheron
Ctenomorpha haworthii
Ctenomorpha macleayi 
Ctenomorpha caprella 
Ctenomorpha salmacis 
genus: Acrophylla Gray
Acrophylla titan
Acrophylla cornuta
Acrophylla nubilosa
Acrophylla paula
Acrophylla ligula
Acrophylla wuelfingi
genus: Eurycnema

Eurycnema goliath
Eurycnema osiris
genus: Baculum
Baculum stilpnoides
genus: Anchiale
Anchiale austrotessulata
Anchiale briareus
Anchiale maculata
Anchiale spinicollis
genus: Arphax
Arphax brunneus
Arphax australis
Arphax dolomedes
Arphax signatus
Arphax michaelseni
genus: Clitarchus
Clitarchus laeviusculus
Clitarchus longipes
genus: Hermarchus
Hermarchus polynesicus
genus: Vetilia
Vetilia enceladus
Vetilia thoon
genus: Onchestus
Onchestus gorgus
Onchestus pasimachus
Onchestus rentzi
(2 undescribed species)
genus: Acanthomima
Acanthomima periphanes
Acanthomima rhipheus
genus: Paronchestus
Paronchestus charon
genus: Ctenomorphodes
Ctenomorphodes briareus
Ctenomorphodes tessulatus
Ctenomorphodes aliena
(3 undescribed species)

subfamily: Xeroderinae

genus: Xeroderus
Xeroderus kirbii
(1 undescribed species)
genus: Cooktownia
Cooktownia plana

subfamily: Tropidoderinae
genus: Extatosoma
Extatosoma tiaratum
 Extatosoma popa
genus: Podacanthus
Podacanthus typhon
Podacanthus viridiroseus
Podacanthus wilkinsoni
(1 undescribed species)
genus: Tropidoderus
Tropidoderus childrenii
Tropidoderus rhodomus
Tropidoderus michaelseni
Tropidoderus gracilifemur
Tropidoderus prasina
genus: Lysicles
Lysicles hippolytus
Lysicles insignis
genus: Vasilissa
Vasilissa walkeri
genus: Didymuria
Didymuria violences
genus: Malandania
Malandania pulchra

unplaced genera:
genus: Bacillus
Bacillus peristhenellus
genus: Eubulides
Eubulides spuria
genus: Austroclonistria
Austroclonistria serrulata
genus: Denhama
Denhama aussa

Phylliidae
subfamily: Phylliinae
genus: Phyllium
Phyllium siccifolium
Phyllium frondosum
genus: Nanophyllium
Nanophyllium pygmaeum

subfamily: Necrosciinae

genus: Necroscia
Necroscia bella
genus: Sipyloidea
Sipyloidea carterus
Sipyloidea filiformis
Sipyloidea gracilipes
Sipyloidea nelida
Sipyloidea ovabdita
Sipyloidea similis
(13 undescribed species)
genus: Haaniella
Haaniella grayii
genus: Anasceles
(1 undescribed species)
genus: Mesaner
Mesaner sarpedon
genus: Parasipyloidea
Parasipyloidea aberrata
Parasipyloidea annulata
Parasipyloidea granulosa
Parasipyloidea ignotus
Parasipyloidea spurcata
Parasipyloidea tener
Parasipyloidea cercata
Parasipyloidea strumosa
Parasipyloidea pallida
(11 undescribed species)
genus: Parasosibia
Parasosibia australica
genus: Neopromachus
Neopromachus sordidus
genus: Malandella
Malandella queenslandica
genus: Scionecra
Scionecra queenslandica

References
Order Phasmatodea Jacobsen & Bianchi, 1902

See also
 List of Australian stick insects and mantids
 Phasmatodea
 Order Phasmatodea, Distribution Map

Phasmatodea